South Valley Stream is an unincorporated hamlet and census-designated place (CDP) in the Town of Hempstead in Nassau County, on Long Island, in New York, United States. The population was 5,962 as of the 2010 census.

South Valley Stream is located in the southern part of the Town of Hempstead, and consists of two unincorporated areas, North Woodmere and Mill Brook.

Geography

Economy 
The Green Acres Mall is located along the border of the hamlet and the Village of Valley Stream.

Demographics

As of the census of 2010, there were 5,962 people, 1,969 households, and 1,554 families residing in the CDP. The population density was 6,415.1 per square mile (2,473.7/km2). There were 2,045 housing units at an average density of 2,326.9/sq mi (897.2/km2). The racial makeup of the CDP was 51.90% White, 23.10% African American, 0.07% Native American, 18.10% Asian, 0.00% Pacific Islander, 4.40% from other races, and 2.20% from two or more races. Hispanic or Latino of any race were 9.80% of the population.

There were 1,969 households, out of which 35.40% had children under the age of 19 living with them, 65.20% were married couples living together, 10.20% had a female householder with no husband present, and 21.10% were non-families. 18.70% of all households were made up of individuals living alone, and 11.70% had someone living alone who was 65 years of age or older. The average household size was 3.02 and the average family size was 3.46.

In the CDP, the population was spread out, with 26.20% under the age of 19, 5.80% from 20 to 24, 21.30% from 25 to 44, 30.80% from 45 to 64, and 15.90% who were 65 years of age or older. The median age was 42.5 years. The population consists of 52% females, and 48% males.

The median income for a household in the CDP was $108,995, and the median income for a family was $118,750.

Education 
The northern portion of the hamlet is served by Valley Stream South High School and Forest Road Elementary School, while the southern portion, south of Rosedale Road, is served by George W. Hewlett High School, Woodmere Middle School, and Ogden Elementary School.

Notable people
 Lon Babby – President of the Phoenix Suns.
 Jeffrey M. Friedman – Discoverer of Leptin.
 Esther Jungreis – Founder of Hineni.
 Larry Miller – Comedian/actor.
 Gary Portnoy – Singer/songwriter, most notably the performer of the Cheers theme song.
 Seth Rudetsky – Composer, musical director and talk show host.

References

Valley Stream, New York
Census-designated places in New York (state)
Hamlets in New York (state)
Census-designated places in Nassau County, New York
Hamlets in Nassau County, New York